Alta is a census-designated place (CDP) in Teton County, Wyoming, United States. The population was 394 at the 2010 census. It is part of the Jackson, WY–ID Micropolitan Statistical Area, and it is located between Driggs, Idaho and the Grand Targhee ski resort.

Geography

Climate

According to the Köppen Climate Classification system, Alta has a warm-summer humid continental climate, abbreviated "Dfb" on climate maps.

Demographics
As of the census of 2000, there were 400 people, 141 households, and 104 families residing in the CDP. The population density was 3.1 people per square mile (1.2/km2). There were 181 housing units at an average density of 1.4/sq mi (0.5/km2). The racial makeup of the CDP was 99.25% White and 0.75% Asian. Hispanic or Latino of any race were 0.25% of the population.

There were 141 households, out of which 34.0% had children under the age of 18 living with them, 65.2% were married couples living together, 7.1% had a female householder with no husband present, and 26.2% were non-families. 18.4% of all households were made up of individuals, and 1.4% had someone living alone who was 65 years of age or older. The average household size was 2.84 and the average family size was 3.28.

In the CDP, the population was spread out, with 28.5% under the age of 18, 7.8% from 18 to 24, 22.0% from 25 to 44, 31.0% from 45 to 64, and 10.8% who were 65 years of age or older. The median age was 41 years. For every 100 females, there were 126.0 males. For every 100 females age 18 and over, there were 118.3 males.

The median income for a household in the CDP was $56,750, and the median income for a family was $57,917. Males had a median income of $38,438 versus $19,107 for females. The per capita income for the CDP was $40,680. About 11.4% of families and 16.8% of the population were below the poverty line, including 24.0% of those under age 18 and none of those age 65 or over.

Education
Public education in Alta is provided by Teton County School District #1 at Alta Elementary School (grades K–5).

Alta has a public library, a branch of the Teton County Library system.

Notable residents
Leland Christensen (1959-2022), politician, was born in Alta.

References

Census-designated places in Teton County, Wyoming
Census-designated places in Wyoming
Jackson, Wyoming micropolitan area